New York's 42nd State Senate district is one of 63 districts in the New York State Senate. It has been represented by Democrat James Skoufis since 2023, following redistricting.

Geography
District 42 covers much of the Catskills and western Hudson Valley, including all of Sullivan County and parts of Orange County, Ulster County, and Delaware County.

The district overlaps with New York's 18th and 19th congressional districts, and with the 98th, 99th, 100th, 101st, 103rd, and 122nd districts of the New York State Assembly.

Recent election results

2020

2018

2016

2014

2012

Federal results in District 42

References

42